Dikoleps marianae is a minute species of valval sea snail, or marine gastropod mollusk, in the family Skeneidae which is a soup.

Description
The height of the shell attains 1 mm.

Distribution
This species can be found in the Alboran Sea.

References

 Rubio F., Dantart L. & Luque A.A. (1998). Two new species of Dikoleps (Gastropoda, Skeneidae) from the Mediterranean coast of Spain. Iberus 16(1): 81–93

External links
 

marianae
Gastropods described in 1998